Odonestis bheroba is a moth of the family Lasiocampidae first described by Frederic Moore in 1858.

Distribution
It is found from Sri Lanka to northern India, Nepal, northern Vietnam, northern Thailand, southern and eastern China, Myanmar and Taiwan.

Description
Body dark orange red. Forewings are almost triangular with a bluish or greyish suffused external margin. Postmedial fascia of forewing is strong. White discal spot and the fasciae are distinct which is mostly flecked with dark scales. Hindwings are darker. Caterpillars are known to feed on Melastoma normale, Rubus species and other Melastoma species.

Subspecies
Two subspecies are recognized.

References

Moths of Asia
Moths described in 1859